CutBank is a literary journal. Cutbank may also refer to:

 Cutbank, Saskatchewan, unincorporated hamlet in Loreburn Rural Municipality No. 254, Saskatchewan, Canada
 Cutbank River, tributary of the Smoky River in western Alberta, Canada
 Cutbank Sandstone, member of the Lower Mannville geologic formation in southern Alberta, Canada

See also
 Cut Bank (disambiguation)